The 1968 ECAC Hockey Men's Ice Hockey Tournament was the 7th tournament in league history. It was played between March 5 and March 9, 1968. Quarterfinal games were played at home team campus sites, while the 'final four' games were played at the Boston Garden in Boston, Massachusetts. By reaching the championship game both, Cornell and Boston College received invitations to participate in the 1968 NCAA University Division Men's Ice Hockey Tournament.

Format
The tournament featured three rounds of play, all of which were single-elimination. The top eight teams, based on conference rankings, qualified to participate in the tournament. In the quarterfinals the first seed and eighth seed, the second seed and seventh seed, the third seed and sixth seed and the fourth seed and fifth seed played against one another. In the semifinals, the winner of the first and eighth matchup played the winner of the fourth and fifth matchup while the other two remaining teams played with the winners advancing to the championship game and the losers advancing to the third place game.

Conference standings
Note: GP = Games played; W = Wins; L = Losses; T = Ties; Pct. = Winning percentage; GF = Goals for; GA = Goals against

Bracket

Note: * denotes overtime period(s)

Quarterfinals

(1) Cornell vs. (8) Princeton

(2) Clarkson vs. (7) Brown

(3) St. Lawrence vs. (6) Boston College

(4) Harvard vs. (5) Boston University

Semifinals

(1) Cornell vs. (5) Boston University

(2) Clarkson vs. (6) Boston College

Third Place

(2) Clarkson vs. (5) Boston University

Championship

(1) Cornell vs. (6) Boston College

Tournament awards

All-Tournament Team

First Team
F Fred Silver (Clarkson)
F Brian Connell (Cornell)
F Tim Sheehy (Boston College)
D Skip Stanowski (Cornell)
D Bruce Pattison (Cornell)
G Ken Dryden* (Cornell)
* Most Outstanding Player(s)

Second Team
F John Hughes (Cornell)
F Herb Wakabayashi (Boston University)
F Peter Tufford (Cornell)
D Andy Hamilton (Clarkson)
D Darrell Abbott (Boston University)
G George McPhee (Boston College)

References

External links
ECAC Hockey
1967–68 ECAC Hockey Standings
1967–68 NCAA Standings

ECAC Hockey Men's Ice Hockey Tournament
ECAC tournament